Kindernet (as Nickelodeon Kindernet from 2011 to 2013) was a Dutch television network that aired classic and modern children's television series from the 1980s onward.

Two iterations of the network have been broadcast; the original lasted from 1988 to 2003, while a Nickelodeon-branded return that launched in 2011 and ended in 2013 for two years.

History

Original (1988–2003) 
Kindernet began as an idea by Dennis Livson, a Finnish producer and distributor of animated programmes in the 1970s. He believed that, at the time, children's programmes made for television were too violent for young viewers. He therefore started a network with so called "violence-free" cartoons. Its first logo reflected the childish aesthetic. The network is finally launched through satellite (Intelsat V 27.5 degrees West) and some cable networks on 1 March 1988. It was founded and owned by Livson's production company Telecable Benelux B.V. with financing by British retailer W H Smith and Japanese company Fuji Eight of the Fujisankei Communications Group. Because of most days, commercial television was not allowed by Dutch law, the Dutch network was broadcast via Luxembourg and England, and is considered to be the first commercial television network in the Netherlands.

From 1988 to 2003, Kindernet aired between 7.00 and 10.00 AM, timesharing with other networks such as the Flemish BRT. In 1995, the director of Kindernet launched VTV, which was aimed at female audiences. Both networks timeshared, though VTV was rather unsuccessful. Later, Kindernet would go on to timeshare with Discovery Channel and Net 5 (from 2000 to 2002). The network then went through a rebranding, during which the name was changed to Kindernet 5 (corresponding to Net 5).

By the end of the year 2001, Kindernet was acquired by MTV Networks Europe, and switched from Net 5 to Veronica in September 2002. This takeover was expressed in the new logo for the network, which heavily resembled the pre-2009 Nickelodeon logo in terms of style and other variations. The last new show to come to Kindernet before this rebrand happened was Thomas & Friends, which had moved from the closed Dutch feed of Cartoon Network. One year later, Kindernet was rebranded as Nickelodeon and ceased broadcast.

Return (2011–13) 
On 4 April 2011, Kindernet was relaunched as part of the Nickelodeon family of networks, replacing TMF. It initially aired between 6.00 AM and 3.00 PM, sharing network space with Comedy Central.

On 1 October 2012, Kindernet's airtime was decreased from 9 hours to 3 hours, now airing from 6.00 to 9.00 AM.

Kindernet officially shut down on 1 November 2013, allowing Comedy Central to expand in its place.

Programming

 Albert the Fifth Musketeer
 Bassie & Adriaan
 Colargol
 Batfink
 Alfred J. Kwak
 Barbapapa
 Calimero
 The World of David the Gnome
 Inspector Gadget
 The Smurfs
 Doctor Snuggles
 Boes
 Dommel
 Mrs. Pepperpot
 Swiss Family Robinson
 Nils Holgersson
 Pinocchio
 Sinbad
 Rupert
 Teddy Ruxpin
 Vicky the Viking
 Budgie the Little Helicopter
 Dino Babies
 The Neverending Story
 Zoo Cup
 Earthworm Jim
 Argai
 The Magic School Bus
 Fat Dog Mendoza
 Li'l Elvis and the Truckstoppers
 Montana Jones
 Simsala Grimm
 Tales from the Cryptkeeper
 Jellabies
 Rolie Polie Olie
 Caillou
 Mumble Bumble
 Thomas & Friends 
 Dora the Explorer

Relaunch era

 Zigby
 Rugrats
 Dobus
 Wizzy & Woppy
 The Snorks
 Big & Betsy
 Samson & Gert
 The Adventures of Tintin
 I.N.K.

See also
Pebble TV

References

External links 
 

Nickelodeon
Defunct television channels in the Netherlands
Television channels and stations established in 1988
Television channels and stations disestablished in 2013
1988 establishments in the Netherlands